The WBSC Asia, formerly known as, Baseball Federation of Asia (BFA) is the governing body of the sport of baseball and softball in Asia. The federation is governed by the World Baseball Softball Confederation.

History
The birth of Baseball Federation of Asia goes back to 1954 when the 2nd Asian Games was held in Manila, Philippines. 

The four countries of Korea, Japan, Taiwan and the Philippines organized a committee aiming at establishing the Baseball Federation of Asia and 7 May of the same year witnessed the commencement of BFA. 

American expatriate Charles Chick Parsons of the Philippines was elected as the first president of the Baseball Federation of Asia.

The BFA became inactive for eight years following the 1975 Asian Baseball Championship. At the sidelines of the FEMBA World Baseball Championship in Tokyo in 1980, the executives of BFA discussed about resuming the activity of the federation. The Asian Baseball Championship was later resumed in 1983 which was held in Seoul. The membership of the federation grew as more Asian nations were admitted to the BFA.

The total number of BFA members at the present time is 24 and 1 non-member observer State (Vietnam).

Members

Baseball

Softball

WBSC World Rankings

Baseball

Softball

Baseball5

Historical leaders
Highest Ranked Asia member in the WBSC Rankings

Men's baseball

Women's baseball

Men's softball

Women's softball

Competitions

Current title holders

See also

Softball Confederation Asia
Baseball at the Asian Games
Asia Series
Asia Winter Baseball League
Baseball awards#Asia

References

External links
 BFA Baseball Federation of Asia
 WBSC Asia

 
Softball governing bodies
Sports organizations established in 1954
Asia